José Francisco Jarque (born 21 September 1971) is a Spanish cyclist. He competed in the men's team pursuit at the 2000 Summer Olympics.

References

External links
 

1971 births
Living people
Spanish male cyclists
Olympic cyclists of Spain
Cyclists at the 2000 Summer Olympics
Sportspeople from Castellón de la Plana
Cyclists from the Valencian Community